Park Sung-Woo (born July 7, 1972) is a South Korean manhwa artist. He made his debut in 1993 in IQ Jump. His author name as a manhwa artist is REDICE.

Works
Anima Cal Livs
Black God
Chun Rhang Yul Jun
Dark Striker
Deja-vu
Meteo Emblem
NOW
Peigenz
Space☆Dandy
Zero

External links
 Studio Zero

1972 births
Living people